"Inu to Tsuki" is Bonnie Pink's eleventh single and fourth released in support of the album Evil & Flowers. The single was released under the Pony Canyon label on October 21, 1998.

Track listing

Good-bye
Only for Him (Live Version)
Heaven's Kitchen (Live Version)

Limited Picture Vinyl
"'Inu to Tsuki" was also released as a limited picture vinyl.

Track listing
a1. 
a2. Evil & Flowers
b1. Do You Crash?
b2.

Oricon Sales Chart

1998 singles
1998 songs
Bonnie Pink songs
Songs written by Bonnie Pink
Pony Canyon singles